Man of honor or Man of Honor may refer to:

 A wedding ceremony participant; see 
 Made man, an initiated member of the Italian-American or Sicilian Mafia
 An alternate name of the 2011 South Korean television drama series Glory Jane

See also 
 Men of Honor (disambiguation)